Acantholipes circumdata is a species of moth in the family Erebidae first described by Francis Walker in 1858. It is found from India and Pakistan through Afghanistan and Iran to the Arabian Peninsula and eastern Africa.

There are multiple generations per year.

The larvae feed on Taverniera spartea.

References

External links

circumdata
Moths of Africa
Moths of Asia
Moths of the Middle East
Moths described in 1858